The 43rd Venice Biennale, held in 1988, was an exhibition of international contemporary art, with 44 participating nations. The Venice Biennale takes place biennially in Venice, Italy. Prizewinners of the 43rd Biennale included: Jasper Johns (International Prize/Golden Lion), the Italian pavilion (best national participation), and Barbara Bloom (best young artist).

Awards

 International Prize/Golden Lion: Jasper Johns
 Golden Lion for best national participation: Italian pavilion 
 Premio 2000 (young artist): Barbara Bloom

References

Bibliography

Further reading 

 
 
 
 
 
 
 
 
 
 
 

1988 in art
1988 in Italy
Venice Biennale exhibitions